Corruption in Colombia  is a pervasive problem at all levels of government, as well as in the military and police forces. A general culture and awareness of this corruption permeates society as a whole. A Global Corruption Barometer survey from 2010 found that the institutions seen as most corrupt were the political parties and the parliament, followed by the police and public officials, the judiciary and the military. Transparency International's 2021 Corruption Perceptions Index, based on experts' and businesspeoples' perceptions of corruption in the public sector, gave Colombia a score of 39 on a scale from 0 ("highly corrupt") to 100 ("highly clean"). When ranked by score, Colombia ranked number 87 among the 180 countries in the Index, where the country ranked number 1 is perceived to have the most honest public sector.

Various factors have contributed to political corruption in Colombia including: drug trafficking, guerrilla and paramilitary conflict, weak surveillance and regulation from institutions, intimidation and harassment of whistle-blowers, and a widespread apathy from society to address unethical behavior. The government is continuously taking steps to measure and reduce levels of corruption at all levels through anti-corruption policies.  Initiatives have also been headed by the private sector in the interest of facilitating and encouraging business activities.

History of corruption 
Practices of corruption that plague politics and the judicial system are, in part, rooted in the colonial legacies of the Spanish conquest.  The Spanish Empire was known to possess a disorganised and corrupt bureaucracy, which was transplanted to its colonies, including Colombia.  The first courts established by the Spaniards in America were also known to be corrupt and inefficient. For example, Colombia inherited the ineffective and distrusted legal system which fails to guarantee private property rights in order to promote economic investment. One of the primary ways colonial elites could make a fortune was through occupying important positions in the judicial bureaucracy of the colony and thereby capturing rents.

Impacts of corruption 
Between 1989 and 1999, corruption in Colombia is estimated to have cost the state 1% of its GDP annually. In addition to the economic cost of corruption, other aspects of Colombian society have been affected such as the loss of credibility of politicians and the Colombian government, as well as the demoralization and disinterest of society at large in political participation.

Recent studies of criminal behavior in the country indicate that while the rate of crime grew annually about 39.7%, the criminal behavior by officials in local and national government grew 164.1%, and despite this increase there are few convictions. The levels of administrative corruption are so high that as of 2011, the media reports of such felonies overshadow the stories on terrorism or armed conflict.

A 2005 study published by Transparency for Colombia (Transparencia por Colombia) assessed the index of integrity of governments, assemblies, and comptrollers at the departmental level and concluded that none of those dependencies scored an appropriate level of integrity. 51% were prone to high or very high levels of corruption.

Colombia's modern corruption takes place mostly at the level of business between politicians and officials with private contractors and companies. The lack of ethical behavior among private individuals or organizations, and politicians has resulted in a culture known in Colombia as "serrucho" (saw), in which it is almost the norm for individuals to bribe politicians in order to be granted contracts and for politicians to add commissions and extra costs for their own benefit. Other sources of corruption come from the result of privatization of government owned institutions in which the profits are used by individuals for their own wealth.

According to Transparency for Colombia, the country ranks 70 in the Perception of Corruption index. However, the problem of corruption is a high priority to only 2.9% of the people interviewed versus violence, which is a high priority to 31.49%, and unemployment, which is a high priority to 20.7%.

According to a study by the Universidad Externado de Colombia, corruption is one of the main factors that render doing business difficult in Colombia. 91% of entrepreneurs consider that some business owners pay bribes. 16.92% say that a businessperson will offer a bribe, and out of the 28.4% of entrepreneurs who were asked for money or favors by a government official, only 8.52% reported it to the authorities in an effective way.

Political corruption 
Current levels of corruption have increased steadily since 2009 and continue getting worse as the Attorney General and the comptroller discover corruption at almost every level of government, from local to national. In September 2009, 48.000 government officials, including 800 mayors and 30 governors, were being investigated for corruption. The issue of corruption has not been isolated to one political party; accusations of corruption span the political spectrum, from right-wing conservatives in the Party of National Unity to the left-wing Democratic Pole.

The discouragement of society from addressing the many cases of corruption in Colombia also stems from the well known immunity: only a small percentage of officials investigated for corruption are likely to suffer legal consequences. In addition, it is difficult for the judicial system to handle many investigations at lower levels. At the top, politicians avoid prosecution via political maneuvering and loopholes, sometimes under the protection of their own political party. An example of this is the attempt by the Party of National Unity to pass a bill that would protect its politicians involved in the parapolitics scandal.

Colombia's corruption is also the result of a long coexistence between the drug trafficking and a rush of society members to achieve easy wealth, thus rendering every aspect of society vulnerable to corruption, from politics, to agriculture and sports.

Corruption within institutions 

Many institutions in Colombia have been the subject of administrative corruption. Some Examples of large institutions, that span across industries and have been involved in major cases of corruption, include: Ferrovias (national railroad administration), Caprecom (health care), Foncolpuertos (ports authority), Termorrio (energy), Dragacol (civil engineering), Chivor reservoir (water supply), and contracts with foreign companies such as Mexican ICA for the pavement of streets in Bogota.

Municipal-level corruption 
Levels of corruption at the local level (towns, cities) has been increasing since the 1990 relative to corruption levels at the national scale

Politic scandals
Colombian corruption scandals  are often related to the conflict that has affected Colombia for 50 years.

The Proceso 8000, the legal investigation to the events that happened in the middle-1990s, when the president of Colombia, Ernesto Samper, was accused of receiving money from drug lords for his electoral campaign.
The Colombian parapolitics scandal, which debuted in 2006, revealed links between politicians and paramilitaries. Supporters of Álvaro Uribe's government are involved in this scandal.
The Yidispolitics Scandal, caused by declarations of the Colombian ex-representative, Yidis Medina, in which she claims that Colombian government offered her important jobs and money if she voted for the approval of Uribe's reelection.
The 2006 DAS scandal, in which the now-defunct Departamento Administrativo de Seguridad (Administrative Department of Security) illegally wiretapped the telephones and other communication lines of Supreme Court magistrates, judges, senators, journalists and other prominent figures perceived as opposition to the Álvaro Uribe administration.
The 2011 DIAN (Office of taxation and customs) scandal in which the administrative staff plotted ways to steal millions of dollars from the Colombian taxpayers through a complex system of fake companies and legal loopholes.
In 2011 a number of mayors in different departments misused money that was supposed to help Colombians that were affected by floods. Instead of using this money for the victims this officials used the funds for political campaigns and personal matters.
In September 2011 former mayor of Bogota Samuel Moreno was convicted for irregularities in contracts with private businesses, under a scandal named "contract carousel" by the media.
In February 2014 a massive corruption network within the Colombian army was exposed. High-ranking military officers siphoned money and took bribes in order to grant contracts. Some of this senior officers took bribes up to 50% of the cost of the contracts they awarded. Other elements of the military were taking money that was intended to be used for military supplies 
In February 2018, the Corte Suprema de Justicia leaked audios in which ex-president Alvaro Uribe talks with Juan Guillermo Villegas, investigated for paramilitarism, about manipulating witnesses in a case against Ivan Cepeda; a Colombian senator. Uribe knew they were being intercepted, and literally says "those sons of bitches are hearing this call".

See also
General 
 Crime in Colombia
 Corruption by country
 Elections in Colombia
 Government of Colombia
 Colombian anti-corruption referendum, 2018

Specific scandals
Colombian parapolitics scandal
Nule Group corruption scandal
Proceso 8000
Yidispolitics Scandal

References

 
Columbia
Crime in Colombia by type
Politics of Colombia